Patrick Anthony Perez (born March 1, 1976) is an American professional golfer who plays in the LIV Golf Invitational Series.

Early life
Perez was born in Phoenix, Arizona, and is of Mexican-American descent. He is married to Ashley Perez.

Professional career
Perez won his first PGA Tour event in 2009 at the Bob Hope Classic; he has finished second there twice. His career high in the Official World Golf Ranking was 16th in 2018.

On January 22, 2009, Perez finished the first 36 holes of the Bob Hope Classic with a 124 (−20), the lowest score, relative to par in PGA Tour history through two rounds. The start set or tied several records, including tying the record for low score (124) in consecutive rounds. Perez went on to win the tournament by three strokes over John Merrick, a win secured when Perez hit his second shot on the par 5, 18th hole, from 200 yards to 3 feet to win with a closing eagle for his first tour win.

Perez also experienced a championship of another sort first-hand. As a neighbor of baseball player Pat Burrell, he had been very close to the Philadelphia Phillies for several years. In a January 2010 interview, he revealed, "I was part of that (2008) team (that won the World Series) because I know all of the guys, I had my locker there, I would come and see them all the time. I would really root for them like I was part of the team." When asked if he had the locker during spring training, he replied "No, the whole thing. I would hit balls with Jimmy Rollins, go out on the field and play catch, whatever. I was like one of them team for that year." When Burrell left as a free agent after the 2008 season and signed with the Tampa Bay Rays, Perez called the news "Worse than me getting hurt."

Perez spent much of the 2015–16 season out of golf after shoulder surgery. He earned his first win since 2009 at the 2016 OHL Classic at Mayakoba. He was also the first player since Harrison Frazar (2011 St. Jude Classic) to win a PGA Tour event while playing on a Medical Extension. Perez won the CIMB Classic in 2017.

As of June 2022, Perez no longer plays on the PGA Tour. He participates in LIV Golf.

Professional wins (4)

PGA Tour wins (3)

1Co-sanctioned by the Asian Tour

Buy.com Tour wins (1)

Buy.com Tour playoff record (1–0)

Results in major championships

CUT = missed the half-way cut
"T" indicates a tie for a place

Summary

Most consecutive cuts made – 5 (2002 PGA – 2005 PGA)
Longest streak of top-10s – 1

Results in The Players Championship

CUT = missed the halfway cut
"T" indicates a tie for a place
C = Canceled after the first round due to the COVID-19 pandemic

Results in World Golf Championships
Results not in chronological order before 2015.

QF, R16, R32, R64 = Round in which player lost in match play
"T" = tied
Note that the HSBC Champions did not become a WGC event until 2009.

See also
2001 PGA Tour Qualifying School graduates

References

External links

American male golfers
Arizona State Sun Devils men's golfers
PGA Tour golfers
LIV Golf players
Golfers from Phoenix, Arizona
Golfers from Scottsdale, Arizona
American sportspeople of Mexican descent
1976 births
Living people